The Comp Air 6 is a light civil utility aircraft manufactured in the United States by Comp Air.

Design and development
The Comp Air 6 is a stretched and widened development of the four-seat Aerocomp CompMonster which had first flown on 3 April 1995.

The Comp Air 6 has a fore-and-aft fuselage splice to widen and lengthen the cabin from the original design. It is usually supplied in kit form. The design is configured as a conventional high-wing monoplane and may be built with either tricycle or tailwheel undercarriage and may alternately be equipped with floats as the CA6SF, amphibious as the CA6AF, or with skis.

Specifications (Comp Air 6, 220 hp Franklin engine)

References

 Jackson, Paul. Jane's All The World's Aircraft 2003–2004. Coulsdon, UK, 2003. . 
Simpson, Rod, Airlife's World Aircraft, 2001, Airlife Publishing Ltd, .

External links

6
Homebuilt aircraft
1990s United States civil utility aircraft
High-wing aircraft
Single-engined tractor aircraft